Clepsis rurinana is a moth of the family Tortricidae. It is found in most of Europe, with the exception of Ukraine and part of the Balkan Peninsula, east to the Near East and the eastern part of the Palearctic realm. It is also present in the Indomalayan realm.

The wingspan is 17–20 mm. The forewings with a hardly sinuate, nearly vertical termen. The costal fold extends from the base to before middle. The ground colour is pale ochreous, somewhat brownish-strigulated. The basal patch is brownish dorsally and the central fascia ochreous-brown, it's anterior edge nearly straight. The costal patch is ochreous-brown, emitting a straight stria. The hindwings are whitish, apex ochreous-tinged, dorsal half light grey. The larva is grey-green; head and plate of 2 brown.

Adults are on wing from early June to late August in one generation in western Europe. The moths are active in afternoon and evening.

The larvae feed on a wide range of plants, including of Urtica, Chelidonium, Convolvulus, Euphorbia, Rumex, Aconitum, Lilium, Anthriscus, Aster, Rosa, Lonicera xylosteum, Acer and Quercus. They live in spun leaves.

References

External links
 
 
 Fauna Europaea
 Lepidoptera of Belgium

Clepsis
Moths described in 1758
Moths of Asia
Moths of Europe
Moths of Japan
Taxa named by Carl Linnaeus